Cystoagaricus strobilomyces is a species of mushroom producing fungus in the family Psathyrellaceae and the type species of the Cystoagaricus genus

Taxonomy 
It was first described in 1945 by the American mycologist William Murrill who discovered the species in Florida and classified it as Nolanea strobilomyces.

In 1947 the German mycologist Rolf Singer created the new genus Cystoagaricus and placed this species within it.

Etymology 
The specific epithet strobilomyces derives from this mushroom's resemblance to members of the Strobilomyces genus as a result of the spiky squamules on the cap.

Description 
Cystoagaricus strobilomyces is a small mushroom with grey flesh which possesses distinctive scales or spikes on the cap.

Cap: 4-30mm. Convex, umbonate or campanulate. Grey to brown in colour with squamules (spikes or scales) which contrast the cap. Gills: Start grey discolouring through pale blue and dark brown as it ages. Adnate or adnexed. Stem: 5-40 tall and 1-3mm in diameter. Grey and covered in scales or woolly tufts. Spore print: Dark brown. Spores: Phaeseoliform (bean shaped), mitriform. 6-7.5 x 5-6 μm.

References 

Psathyrellaceae
Cystoagaricus
Fungi described in 1947